Grimscott is a village in north Cornwall, England, UK.

Half a mile east of the village is Grimscott SSSI (Site of Special Scientific Interest), noted for its biological interest.

References

Villages in Cornwall
Sites of Special Scientific Interest in Cornwall
Sites of Special Scientific Interest notified in 1992